ㅚ (oe) is one of the Korean hangul. The Unicode for ㅚ is U+315A.

Hangul jamo
Vowel letters